Mario Enrico Delpini (born 29 July 1951) is an Italian prelate of the Roman Catholic Church. He has been serving as the Archbishop of Milan since his installation on 9 September 2017. He previously served as auxiliary bishop and vicar general of that archdiocese.

Life
Mario Enrico Delpini grew up in Jerago con Orago and in 1975 was ordained to the priesthood. He earned a degree in Italian Literature from the Università Cattolica del Sacro Cuore and a licentiate in theology. Since 1975, Delpini taught the Italian language in the minor seminary of his native archdiocese and in 1989 he was named as the rector of the minor seminary. In 1993, he was named as the dean of the seminary of Venegono Inferiore and in 2000 he became the rector of all seminaries of the Milan archdiocese.

In 2006, Cardinal Dionigi Tettamanzi placed him in charge of one of the archdiocesan zones. On 13 July 2007, Pope Benedict XVI named Delpini as the Titular bishop of Stephaniacum, and Tettamanzi consecrated Delpini as a bishop on the following 23 September. Cardinal Angelo Scola made him as the vicar general of the archdiocese in 2012.

On 7 July 2017, Pope Francis appointed him as the new Archbishop of Milan, where he was installed on 9 September.

On 27 August 2022, for the first time in the Archdiocese of Milan's history, the Pope chose to appoint cardinal an ordinare bishop (Mgr. Oscar Cantoni) instead of the Archbishop of Milan.

References 

1951 births
Living people
People from the Province of Varese
21st-century Italian Roman Catholic bishops
Archbishops of Milan